QAG may refer to:
The Queensland Art Gallery, an art museum in Brisbane, Queensland, Australia
 Qualification Approval Guide for flight simulators
Qimonda AG, a German company that manufactures computer memory chips
A routine in the QUADPACK library for numerical integration
Quality Assurance Group, Quality assurance referring to the ITIL Service Transition phase, a group that vets the quality phase of the event lifecycle